Traces of Time in Love is the tenth Mandarin studio album by Taiwanese Mandopop artist Rainie Yang. It was released on 30 September 2016 through EMI, her second album on the sublabel of Universal Music Taiwan.

The album was nominated for three awards at the 28th Golden Melody Awards, including Song of the Year, Best Lyricist and Best Single Producer, for the title track "Traces of Time in Love".

Track listing

 Notes
 "Traces of Time in Love" ("年輪說") was featured as the opening theme song of the drama series Life Plan A and B.
 "The Lesson of Love" ("相愛的方法") was featured as the ending theme song of the drama series Life Plan A and B.
 "Being Single" ("單") was featured as an insert song of the drama series Life Plan A and B.

Music videos

References

External links 
 Traces of Time in Love @ Universal Music Taiwan 

2016 albums
Rainie Yang albums
Universal Music Taiwan albums